Mooca may refer to:
 Subprefecture of Mooca, São Paulo
 Mooca (district of São Paulo)
 Bresser-Mooca (São Paulo Metro)